Julius Obiefuna Chigbolu (19 February 1929 – 18 April 2010) was a Nigerian athlete. He competed in the men's high jump at the 1956 Summer Olympics. He is the grandfather of Italian 400 m athlete Maria Benedicta Chigbolu.

References

1929 births
2010 deaths
Athletes (track and field) at the 1956 Summer Olympics
Athletes (track and field) at the 1958 British Empire and Commonwealth Games
Nigerian male high jumpers
Olympic athletes of Nigeria
Place of birth missing
Commonwealth Games competitors for Nigeria
20th-century Nigerian people